The 1904 Syracuse Orangemen football team represented Syracuse University during the 1904 college football season. The head coach was Charles P. Hutchins, coaching his first season with the Orangemen.

Schedule

References

Syracuse
Syracuse Orange football seasons
Syracuse Orangemen football